The Industrial Revolution in the United States was an epoch in the United States during the late 18th and 19th centuries when the economy of the U.S. progressed from manual labor and farm labor to a greater degree of industrialization based on labor. There were many improvements in technology and manufacturing fundamentals with results that greatly improved overall production and economic growth in the U.S.

The Industrial Revolution occurred in two distinct phases, the First Industrial Revolution occurred during the latter part of the 18th century through the first half of the 19th century and the Second Industrial Revolution advanced following the American Civil War. Among the main contributors to the First Industrial Revolution were Samuel Slater's introduction of British industrial methods in textile manufacturing to the United States, Eli Whitney's invention of the cotton gin, Éleuthère Irénée du Pont's improvements in chemistry and gunpowder making, and other industrial advancements necessitated by the War of 1812, as well as the construction of the Erie Canal among other developments.

Origins 

As Western Europe industrialized in the mid-to-late 1700s, the United States remained agrarian with resource processing, gristmills, and sawmills being the main industrial, non-agrarian output. As demand for U.S. resources increased, canals and railroads became important to the economic growth as transportation necessitated and the U.S. population was sparse, especially in areas where resources were being extracted such as the American frontier. This made it necessary to expand technological capabilities, which led to an Industrial Revolution in America as entrepreneurs, businesses competed with and learned from each other to develop better technology, fundamentally altering the U.S. economy. Some technologies that advanced the Industrial Revolution in the U.S. were appropriated from British designs by ambitious British entrepreneurs hoping to use the technology to create successful companies in the U.S. Much of the Industrial Revolution in the U.S. originated in the Lehigh Valley region of eastern Pennsylvania, where iron ore, steel, textile, and industrial sectors experienced breakthroughs and emerged as global manufacturing leaders. 

One entrepreneur who is most associated with starting up the textiles industry in the U.S. and who initially brought the textile technology to the U.S. was Samuel Slater. Slater learned that Americans were interested in textile techniques used in England, but since exporting such technical designs were illegal in England, he memorized as much as he could and departed for New York. Moses Brown, a leading Rhode Island industrialist secured the services of Slater, with Slater promising to recreate British textile designs. After an initial investment by Brown to fulfill initial requirements, a mill successfully opened in 1793 being the first water-powered roller spinning textile mill in America. By 1800, Slater's mill had been duplicated by many other entrepreneurs as Slater grew wealthier and his techniques more and more popular, with Andrew Jackson calling Slater the "Father of the American Industrial Revolution". But Slater also earned the pejorative "Slater the Traitor" from many in Great Britain who felt he betrayed them in bringing British textile techniques to the Americas.

With the invention of the cotton gin by Eli Whitney in 1794, American slaveholders now had the means to make cotton production significantly more profitable. The era of King Cotton was underway by the early 1800's to such an extent that by the mid-19th century, Southern slave plantations supplied 75% of the world's cotton. The introduction of the cotton gin was as unexpected as it was unprecedented. British textiles had expanded with no change in ginning principles in centuries. For the American planter class, up front costs were higher but productivity improvement among their slaves were clear and Whitney's original 1794 gin design was copied by many and improved upon.

The du Pont family emigrated to the United States due to repercussions from the French Revolution, bringing with them expertise in chemistry and gunpowder.  E.I. du Pont observed that the quality of American gunpowder was poor, and so opened the Eleutherian Mills a gunpowder mill on Brandywine Creek in 1802. The mill served as home for du Pont's family as well as a center of business and social life, with employees living on or near the mill. The company grew rapidly and by the mid-19th century had become the largest supplier of gunpowder to the United States military.

In the late 1700s, Pennsylvanian Robert Fulton proposed plans for steam-powered vessels to both the United States and British governments. Having developed significant technical knowledge in both France and Great Britain, Fulton returned to the United States working with Robert Livingston to open the first commercially successful steamboat operating between New York City and Albany. Fulton built a new steamboat sturdy enough to take down the Ohio and Mississippi rivers, he was an early member on a commission to plan the Erie Canal, and Fulton designed the first working muscle-powered submarine, the Nautilus.

In the 1780s, the Erie Canal was proposed, then re-proposed in 1807 with a survey being funded in 1808. Construction began in 1817 and the original canal was about 363 miles with 34 numbered locks, from Albany to Buffalo. Prior to the canal, bulk goods were limited to shipping by pack animal, there were no railways and water was the most cost-effective way to ship bulk goods. Use of this new canal was faster than using carts pulled by draft animals and cut transport costs by about 95%. The canal gave New York City's port a significant advantage over all other U.S. port cities and contributed to a growth in population in New York state as well as opening up regions farther west to settlement.

Labor and finance 
The First Industrial Revolution which lasted into the mid-19th century, was marked by shift in labor, where in the United States an outwork system of labor shifted towards a factory system of labor. Throughout this period, much of the U.S. population remained in small scale agriculture. Despite a smaller percentage of the population working in industry then, the U.S. government did take action to try and expand and aid U.S. industry. This can be seen early in the nation's history with Alexander Hamilton's proposal of the "American School" ideas which supported high tariffs to protect U.S. industry. This idea was embraced by the Whig Party in the early 19th century with their support for Henry Clay's American System. This plan, proposed shortly after the War of 1812, supported not only tariffs to protect U.S. industry but also canals and roads to support the movement of manufactured goods around the country. As was the case in Britain, the First Industrial Revolution in the United States revolved heavily around the textile industry. Early U.S. textile plants were located next to rivers and streams as they would use the running water to power the machinery in the plant. This meant that much of the factories of the First Industrial Revolution existed in the Northeastern United States

To aid the expansion of industry, Congress chartered the Bank of the United States in 1791, giving loans to help merchants and entrepreneurs secure needed capital. However, Jeffersonians saw this bank as an unconstitutional expansion of federal power, so when its charter expired in 1811, the Jeffersonian-dominated Congress did not renew it. State legislatures were persuaded to charter their own banks to continue helping merchants, artisans, and farmers who needed loans, and, by 1816, there were 246 state-chartered banks. With these banks, states were able to support internal transportation improvements, such as the Erie Canal, which stimulated economic development.

Impact of Industrial Revolution on the United States 

The Industrial Revolution altered the U.S. economy and set the stage for the United States to dominate technological change and growth in the Second Industrial Revolution and the Gilded Age. The Industrial Revolution also saw a decrease in labor shortages which had characterized the U.S. economy through its early years. This was partly due to a transportation revolution happening at the same time, low population density areas of the U.S. were better able to connect to the population centers through the Wilderness Road and the Erie Canal, with steamboats as well as rail transport. This led to a phenomenon of urbanization which increased the labor force available around larger cities such as New York City and Chicago, lessening the classic American labor shortages of the time. Also, quicker movement of resources and goods around the country drastically increased trade efficiency and output while allowing for an extensive transport base for the U.S. to grow during the Second Industrial Revolution.

Techniques to make interchangeable parts were developed in the US, and allowed easy assembly and repair of firearms or other devices, minimizing the time and skill needed to repair or assemble devices. By the beginning of the Civil War, rifles with interchangeable parts had been developed, and after the war, more complex devices such as sewing machines and typewriters were made with interchangeable parts. In 1798, Eli Whitney obtained a government contract to manufacture 10,000 muskets in less than two years. By 1801, he had failed to produce a single musket and was called to Washington to justify his use of Treasury funds. There, he created a demonstration for Congress in which he assembled muskets from parts chosen randomly from his supply. While this demonstration was later proved to be fake, it popularized the idea of interchangeable parts, and Eli Whitney continued using the concept to allow relatively unskilled laborers to produce and repair weapons quickly and at a low cost. Another important innovator is Thomas Blanchard, who in 1819 invented the Blanchard lathe, which could produce identical copies of wooden gun stocks.

Interchangeable parts made the development of the assembly line possible. In addition to making production faster, the assembly line eliminated the need for skilled craftsmen because each worker would only do one repetitive step instead of the entire process.

The first Industrial Revolution had a profound effect on labor in the U.S. Companies from the era, such as the Boston Associates, would recruit thousands of New England farm girls to work in textile mills. These girls often received much lower wages than men, though the work and pay gave young women a sense of independence that they did not feel working on a farm. The First Industrial Revolution also marked the beginning of the rise of wage labor in the United States. As wage labor grew over the next century, it would go on to profoundly change American society.

References

External links
"The Industrial Revolution in the United States", Library of Congress

United States
Industry in the United States
Industrial history of the United States